Ortaalan is a village in the Ardeşen District, Rize Province, in Black Sea Region of Turkey. Its population is 290 (2021).

History 
Most villagers are ethnically Laz. The village has two neighborhoods, which are called Paniki and Papat.

Geography

References

Villages in Ardeşen District
Laz settlements in Turkey